Mankachar College, established in 1971, is a general degree college situated at Mankachar, in South Salmara district, Assam. This college is affiliated with the Gauhati University.

Departments

Science
Physics
Mathematics
Chemistry
Botany
Zoology

Arts and Commerce
 Assamese
 English
History
Education
Economics
Philosophy
Political Science

References

External links
http://www.mankacharcollege.org

Universities and colleges in Assam
Colleges affiliated to Gauhati University
Educational institutions established in 1971
1971 establishments in Assam